Stedesdorf is a municipality in the district of Wittmund, in Lower Saxony, Germany.

References

Wittmund (district)